, is a Japanese futsal player and futsal manager. Japanese national futsal team.

Career

Player 
In 1982, he was born in Asahikawa, Hokkaido, Japan. He graduated from Asahikawa City Midorigaoka Junior High School and Hokkaido Asahikawa Business High School. He played soccer in junior high school and high school. When he entered Juntendo University in 2001, he switched from soccer to futsal in his third year of university. In 2004, he joined PREDATOR (Bardral Urayasu).

In May 2004, he participated in the 2004 AFC Futsal Championship. In November 2004, he participated in the 2004 FIFA Futsal World Championship. In both competitions, he was the youngest player of Japanese national futsal team. In May 2005, he participated in the 2005 AFC Futsal Championship. In 2007, the first F.League was held as Japan's first national league. In 2007-08 season, he scored 7 goals in the F.League.

In July 2008, he joined to Caja Segovia FS in the Spanish Primera Division. He signed a professional contract with a number of 10. He then injured his right knee, so he was unable to participate in the 2008 FIFA Futsal World Cup. In the 2009-10 season, he became the main player of the Kaha Segovia FS. In 2010, he joined to UD Guadalajara FS in the Spanish Primera Division.

In May 2011, he moved to the old nest of Valdral Urayasu. In 2011-12 season, he was selected the F.League Best 5. In 2012, he participated in the 2012 FIFA Futsal World Cup. After 2015-16 season, he retired from futsal.

Manager 
In 2016, he became technical director of Valdral Urayasu. In 2017, he took over as manager of Valdral Urayasu.

In April 2018, he took over as manager of Indonesia national futsal team.

Clubs 
 2004-2008  Bardral Urayasu
 2008-2010  Caja Segovia FS
 2010-2011  UD Guadalajara FS
 2011-2016  Bardral Urayasu

Managerial Teams 
 2017-2018.3  Bardral Urayasu
 2018.4-  Indonesia national futsal team

Titles

Club 
 All Japan Futsal Championship (1)
 2006

Individual 
 F.League Best 5 (1)
 2011-12

References

External links
 
 FIFA profile

1982 births
Living people
Japanese men's futsal players
Japanese futsal coaches
Bardral Urayasu players